Wood